Hemilepistus is a genus of woodlice, created by G. H. A. Budde-Lund in 1879 as a subgenus of Porcellio, but raised to the rank of genus by Karl Wilhelm Verhoeff in 1930. It contains the following species:

Hemilepistus aphganicus Borutzky, 1958
Hemilepistus buddelundi Borutzky, 1945
Hemilepistus communis Borutzky, 1945
Hemilepistus crenulatus (Pallas, 1771)
Hemilepistus cristatus Budde-Lund, 1885
Hemilepistus elongatus Budde-Lund, 1885
Hemilepistus fedtschenkoi (Uljanin, 1875)
Hemilepistus heptneri Borutzky, 1945
Hemilepistus klugii (Brandt, 1833)
Hemilepistus magnus Borutzky, 1945
Hemilepistus nodosus Budde-Lund, 1885
Hemilepistus pavlovskii Borutzky, 1954
Hemilepistus reaumuri (Milne-Edwards, 1840)
Hemilepistus reductus Borutzky, 1945
Hemilepistus rhinoceros Borutzky, 1958
Hemilepistus ruderalis (Pallas, 1771)
Hemilepistus russonovae Borutzky, 1951
Hemilepistus schirasi Lincoln, 1970
Hemilepistus zachvatkini Verhoeff, 1930

The species are all endemic to Central Asia, except H. reaumuri, which is found from Syria to Algeria.

References

External links

Trachelipodidae